The following is a list of Belgian military equipment of World War II which includes artillery, vehicles and vessels. World War II was a global war that was under way by 1939 and ended in 1945. On 10 May 1940, Nazi Germany, which aimed to dominate Europe, attacked Belgium as part of their war with France. By 28 May 1940 the Belgian mainland had surrendered to German forces, although the colony of Belgian Congo remained independent throughout the war. Belgian power was not restored until final Axis collapse in late 1944. This list covers the equipment of the Belgian Army and the Force Publique of Belgian Congo, but not the Free Belgian Forces or Belgian mainland forces after October 1944, which was equipped completely by foreign forces.

Knives and bayonets
Fairbairn–Sykes fighting knife

Small arms

Pistols 
Browning Hi-Power (Pistole Automatique Browning GP 35)
FN Model 1910
FN Model 1922
FN Model 1900
FN Model 1903
FN Model 1905
FN Baby Browning
Colt M1903 Pocket Hammerless
Ruby M1915

Revolvers 
Nagant M1895
MAS Modele 1892
Smith & Wesson No. 3
Webley Bulldog
Pieper M1893

Automatic pistols and submachine guns
MP 28 (Pieper Bayard mle 1934) 1.500-1.811
MP 18
STEN Mk II

Rifles
Mauser Model 1889 (often modernized to Model 1889/36 version)
 Belgian Mauser Model 1935
 Mauser Model 1893
 Lebel M1886/93
 Mauser Gewehr 98
 Lee-Enfield
 Mosin-Nagant M1891/30
 Winchester M1894
Mauser K98AZ (Given in reparation payments to Belgium post WW1 and issued to reserve units)

Grenades and grenade launchers
 Mills bomb

Machine guns

Infantry and dual-purpose machine guns
 Fusil-mitrailleur Mle 1930 Browning Belgian licensed version of the American BAR M1918A2
 MG 08/15
 Hotchkiss M1909
 Chauchat M1915
 Lewis
 Browning M1919

Heavy machine guns 

 Vickers
 Maxim M1911
 MG 08
 Hotchkiss M1914
 Colt-Browning M1895/14

Vehicle and aircraft machine guns
 Hotchkiss M1929 machine gun
 Fusil-mitrailleur 1930 (on T-13 and some T-15)

Artillery

Infantry mortars

 70mm van Deuren mortar
Stokes mortar (81mm, also fortress version)

Heavy mortars & rocket launchers
142mm Delattre mortar - fired cluster bombs

Field artillery
Canon de 75 mle TA 1877
Canon de 75 mle GP III (also fortress version)
Canon de 75 mle GP1 (also fortress version)
Canon de 75 mle GP II
Canon de 75 mle TR
Canon de 75 modele 1934
Canon de 76 FRC (also fortress version)
10 cm K 17 - World War I German gun
Canon de 120mm L mle 1931 (also fortress version)

Fortress and siege guns
57 mm Cockerill-Nordenfeld
Canon de 105 mle 1913 Schneider
10.5 cm leFH 16 (Obusier de 105 GP)
15 cm cannon w/o recoil system - 15 cm sFH 13
Obusier de 6” - former BL 6-inch Mk I naval gun?
Canone de 155 L mle 1924
17 cm SK L/40 i.R.L. auf Eisenbahnwagen - German rail gun of WWI

Anti-tank guns
47 mm Model 1931 anti-tank gun
 canon antichar de 60 mm

Anti-tank weapons (besides anti-tank guns)
 Boys anti-tank rifle (Le Fusil Antichar Boys Mark 1)

Anti-aircraft weapons

Light anti-aircraft guns
M1918 Browning Automatic Rifle (on some T-15)
MG 18 TuF (AA/AT)

Heavy anti-aircraft guns
 75 mm FRC M27 (German 8.8 cm SK L/45 naval gun relined to 75mm)
 Belgian M36 (French M32)
 C75 DTCA M34 (French 75 mm CA Mle 1917)
 QF 3.7-inch AA gun

Vehicles
Berliet VUDB armoured car (12 imported from France in 1930)
See also Belgian combat vehicles of World War II

Tankettes
T-15 Light tank
T-13 tank destroyer

Tanks
Renault FT
ACG-1 (Renault AMC-35)

Self-propelled guns

Tank-based

Other

Armored cars
Minerva Armored Car - World War I vintage

Armored carriers

Engineering and command

Trucks
 FN Tricar

Passenger cars
 Adler 2 Liter

Motorcycles
FN 12a SM

Tractors & prime movers
Vickers Carden Loyd Utility Tractor - 3 models
Marmon-Herrington Armoured Car - unarmed tractor version built by Ford Antwerp

Miscellaneous vehicles

Navy ships and war vessels
Belgian ship A4
HMS Buttercup (K193)
HMS Godetia (K226)
List of ships of the Second World War

Aircraft

 Koolhoven F.K.56
 Fairey Firefly II
 Fairey Fox
 Hawker Hurricane
 Renard R.35B - design plans only
 Renard R.36
 Airco DH.4 - built in 1926, as transport only at outbreak of war
 SABCA S.40 - trainer
 Caproni Ca.135 (license-build as SABCA S.45)
 Caproni Ca.310 (license-build as SABCA S.46)
 Caproni Ca.335 (license-build as SABCA S.47)
 Caproni Ca.312 (license-build as SABCA S.48)
 Fiat CR.42 Falco
 Stampe et Vertongen SV.4 - trainer
 Stampe et Vertongen SV.5
 Stampe et Vertongen SV.10
 Fairey Battle
 Fokker F.VII

Secret weapons

Radars

Missiles & bombs

Cartridges and shells

See also
List of Australian military equipment of World War II
List of British military equipment of World War II
List of Bulgarian military equipment of World War II
List of military equipment of the Canadian Army during the Second World War
List of Chinese military equipment in World War II
List of Croatian military equipment of World War II
List of Dutch military equipment of World War II
List of World War II weapons of France
List of German military equipment of World War II
List of Italian Army equipment in World War II
List of Japanese military equipment of World War II
Military equipment of Sweden during World War II
List of Thailand military equipment of World War II
List of equipment of the United States Army during World War II

References

 
 
Belgium Army World War II